Saugandh may refer to:
Saugandh (1942 film), a Bollywood film of 1942

Saugandh (1982 film), by Ravikant Nagaich
Saugandh (1991 film)
Saugandh (2000 film), see Shakti Kapoor filmography